is a Japanese Olympic show jumping rider. Representing Japan, he competed at six consecutive Summer Olympics (in 1996, 2000, 2004, 2008, 2012 and 2016). He placed 11th in team jumping in 2000. Meanwhile, his current best individual Olympic placement is 15th place from Athens in 2004.

He is the son of the Olympic rider and riding club owner Masayu Sugitani. After graduating from Canadian Academy in Kobe in 1996, he moved to the Netherlands to get coached by former Dutch champion Henk Nooren.

Sugitani also competed at six editions World Equestrian Games (each edition from 1994 to 2014) and at two editions of Show Jumping World Cup finals (in 2000 and 2007). In 2010, he was 10th place at the World Equestrian Games in Kentucky.

Sugitani won two bronze medals at the 2014 Asian Games in Incheon, South Korea.

Family
Koichi Kawaguchi
Masayasu Sugitani

References

Living people
1976 births
People from Izumi, Osaka
Japanese male equestrians
Equestrians at the 1996 Summer Olympics
Equestrians at the 2000 Summer Olympics
Equestrians at the 2004 Summer Olympics
Equestrians at the 2008 Summer Olympics
Equestrians at the 2012 Summer Olympics
Equestrians at the 2016 Summer Olympics
Olympic equestrians of Japan
Equestrians at the 2014 Asian Games
Equestrians at the 2018 Asian Games
Asian Games silver medalists for Japan
Asian Games bronze medalists for Japan
Asian Games medalists in equestrian
Medalists at the 2014 Asian Games
Medalists at the 2018 Asian Games